Melvin Wallace Bleeker (August 20, 1920April 24, 1996) was a professional American football player who played halfback for four seasons in the National Football League for the Philadelphia Eagles and Los Angeles Rams.

Early life
Bleeker was born and raised in Los Angeles, California, and was Jewish. He attended John C. Fremont High School. In 1938, playing football for Fremont, he was named All-Southern California High School Football First-team, and All-Southern California High School Track and Field Honor Roll.

College
He then attended the University of Southern California. For USC, he competed for the Trojans in both football from 1940 to 1942, as quarterback, halfback, and fullback, and for the track team in the broad jump, for whom he won the Conference championship in 1941 and took second place in the 1942 NCAA Track and Field Championships (23-11½). He also served in the United States Army.

Football career
In 1943 Bleeker played for the Los Angeles Bulldogs in the Pacific Coast Professional Football League (PCFL).

He broke into the National Football League and was the NFL's top receiver in his rookie year of 1944, as Bleeker played 9 games for the Philadelphia Eagles, starting three of them. That season, he was second in the NFL in long reception (75), third in touchdowns (8; still the team's all-time rookie record) and yards/rushing attempt (5.3), fourth in yards from scrimmage (614), and sixth in points scored (48). That season he led the Eagles in touchdowns and scoring, despite having been primarily a blocking back in college.

He played two more seasons for the Eagles.  In 1947 the Eagles traded Bleeker to the Los Angeles Rams for Art Mergenthal.

In 2014 he was inducted into the Southern California Jewish Sports Hall of Fame.

References

1920 births
1996 deaths
USC Trojans men's track and field athletes
USC Trojans football players
Players of American football from Los Angeles
American football halfbacks
Philadelphia Eagles players
Los Angeles Rams players
Jewish American sportspeople
United States Army soldiers
20th-century American Jews
Track and field athletes from Los Angeles